Trouble Walkin' is the fourth full-length solo album released by Ace Frehley. No longer under the band name Frehley's Comet, the album features guest performances by former Kiss drummer Peter Criss, as well as Skid Row members Sebastian Bach, Rachel Bolan and Dave Sabo.

The album peaked at No. 102 on the Billboard 200 chart. The lone single, a cover of The Move's "Do Ya", did not chart. "Hide Your Heart", co-written by Paul Stanley, first appeared on Bonnie Tyler's Hide Your Heart album, and later appeared on Kiss' Hot in the Shade, which was released four days later. Lead vocals for "2 Young 2 Die" were provided by rhythm guitarist and backing vocalist Richie Scarlet. Former Kiss drummer Peter Criss was thanked for his contributions which were limited to backing vocals on "Hide Your Heart", "Trouble Walkin'", "2 Young 2 Die" and "Back to School".

UK-based company Rock Candy Records reissued this album on CD in 2014.

Track listing
All lead vocals by Ace Frehley, except where noted.

Personnel
Band members
 Ace Frehley - lead guitar, vocals, producer
 Richie Scarlet - rhythm guitar, vocals
 John Regan - bass guitar, synthesizer, producer
 Anton Fig - drums, percussion

Additional musicians
 Sandy Slavin - drums on "Trouble Walkin'"
 Peter Criss - backing vocals on "Hide Your Heart", "Trouble Walkin'", "2 Young 2 Die" and "Back to School"
 Sebastian Bach, Dave Sabo, Rachel Bolan, Peppi Castro, Al Fritsch, Pat Sommers - backing vocals

Production
 Eddie Kramer - producer, engineer, mixing at Bearsville Studios, Bearsville, NY
 David Cook, Mike Reiter, Eddie Solan, Chris Laidlaw - engineers
 Scott Mabuchi - mixing
 Ted Jensen - mastering at Sterling Sound, New York City
 Bob Defrin - art direction
 Larry Freemantle - cover design
 Brad Hitz - photography

Charts
Album - Billboard (United States)

Releases
Megaforce 82042-1 (LP)
Megaforce 82042-2 (CD)
Atlantic 82042 (CD re-release)

References

1989 albums
Ace Frehley albums
Albums produced by Eddie Kramer
Albums produced by John Regan
Megaforce Records albums